Edwards is a patronymic surname of English origin, meaning "son of Edward". Edwards is the 14th most common surname in Wales and 21st most common in England. Within the United States, it was ranked as the 49th-most common surname as surveyed in 1990, falling to 51st in 2014.

Persons with surname Edwards
Edwards (baseball)

A
 Aaron Edwards (born 1984), Australian rules footballer
 Aaron Edwards (football) (born 1969), Gibraltarian footballer
 Ada Mae Edwards (1911–2004), Saint Kitts and Nevis politician

 Alexander Edwards (1885–1918), Scottish recipient of the Victoria Cross

 Amanda Edwards (living), American politician
 Amelia Edwards (1831–1892), English novelist, journalist, traveller and Egyptologist
 Amelia Edwards (publisher), co-founder of Walker Books
 Amy Edwards (living), Australian actor and singer
 Andy Edwards (footballer, born 1971), English footballer and manager
 Andy Edwards (footballer, born 1965), Welsh footballer
 Andy Edwards (musician), English drummer
 Andy Edwards (sculptor), English artist
 Andrew Edwards (cricketer) (born 1978), English cricketer
 Andrew David Edwards (born 1958), American serial killer
 Anthony Edwards (actor) (born 1962), American actor and director
 Anthony Edwards (American football) (born 1966), American football wide receiver
 Anthony Edwards (basketball) (born 2001), American basketball player
 Anthony Edwards (rower) (born 1972), Australian Olympic rower
 Antony Edwards (1910–1978), English cricketer

 Archie Edwards (1918–1998), American Piedmont blues guitarist
 Austin Edwards (born 1997), American football player
 Austin Burton Edwards (1909–1960), Australian mineralogist and petrologist

B

 Bela Bates Edwards (1802–1852), American theologian

 Bernard Edwards (American football) (born 1969), American football player

 Blake Edwards (1922–2010), American film director, screenwriter and producer
 Blake Edwards (cricketer) (born 1999), Australian cricketer

 Braylon Edwards (born 1983), American football wide receiver

C
Caitlyn Edwards (born 1996), Australian rules footballer
Carl Edwards (born 1979), American racing driver

Carlos Edwards (born 1978), Trinidadian former footballer
Carsen Edwards (born 1998), American basketball player
Charles Edwards (journalist) (1906–1983), Canadian journalist and news agency executive
Charlie Edwards (boxer) (born 1993), British boxer
Charlotte Edwards (born 1979), English cricketer
Clancy Edwards (born 1955), American sprinter
Clarence Edwards (blues musician) (1933–1993), American blues musician
Chet Edwards (born 1951), American politician
Clement Edwards (1869–1938), Welsh lawyer, journalist, activist and politician
Clement Alexander Edwards (1812–1882), British soldier
Clarence Ransom Edwards (1860–1931), American military general

Colin Edwards (born 1974), American motorcycle racer

Cyrus Edwards (1793–1877), American politician and lawyer

D

Daniel Edwards (born 1965), American contemporary artist

Derek Edwards (born 1958), Canadian comedian
Derek Edwards (rugby league) (flourished 1960s–1970s, died 2020), English rugby league footballer
Dianne Edwards (born 1942), Welsh paleobotanist
Doc Edwards (1936–2018), American baseball player, coach, and manager
Don Edwards (1915–2015), American politician

Donna Edwards (born 1958), American politician
Donna Edwards (actress) (born 1963), Welsh actress

Doug Edwards (born 1971), American professional basketball player
Doug Edwards (musician) (1946–2016), Canadian musician
Douglas Edwards (1917–1990), American television news anchor
Duncan Edwards (1936–1958), English association footballer

E
 Ed Edwards (living), British corporate executive and film director

Edwin Edwards (1927–2021), American politician, including Governor of Louisiana

F
Fidel Edwards (born 1982), Barbadian cricketer

G
Gareth Edwards (born 1947), Welsh rugby union player

George Edwards (disambiguation), multiple people
Glen Edwards (pilot), test pilot, namesake of Edwards Air Force Base
Glynn Edwards (1931–2018), British actor
Graham Edwards (disambiguation), multiple people

H

Harry Stillwell Edwards (1855–1938), American journalist, novelist, and poet
Helen Edwards (artist) (1882–1963), British artist
Henrietta Edwards, Canadian feminist and author
Henry Sutherland Edwards (1828–1906), English journalist and author

Herm Edwards, Professional American football player and coach
Hugh Edwards (disambiguation), multiple people
Sir Hughie Edwards, RAF Air Commodore, Governor of Western Australia
Humphrey Edwards (1582-1658), English commissioner, courtier, and member of Parliament
Huw Edwards (disambiguation), multiple people

I
India Edwards (died 1990), Vice Chairwoman of the Democratic National Committee
Iwan Edwards (1937–2022), Canadian choral conductor

J
J. Gordon Edwards (1867–1925), Canadian film director
J. Gordon Edwards (entomologist and mountaineer) (1919–2004), American entomologist, mountain climber, author, and park ranger
Jack Edwards (disambiguation), multiple people
Jackie Edwards (disambiguation), multiple people
Jamal Edwards (1990–2022), British entrepreneur
Jango Edwards, US-American clown and entertainer
Jimmy Edwards, English Comedian
John Edwards (disambiguation), multiple people
Jonathan Edwards (disambiguation), multiple people
Junior D. Edwards (1926–1951), American Medal of Honor recipient

K
Kathryn Edwards (born 1964), reality television star in The Real Housewives of Beverly Hills
Kenny Edwards (rugby league) (born 1989), New Zealand rugby league player
Kirk Edwards (born 1983), Barbadian cricketer
Kyle Edwards (disambiguation), multiple people
Kyler Edwards (born 2000), American basketball player

L
LaVell Edwards (1930–2016), American football coach
LeRoy Edwards (1914–1971), pioneer of early American professional basketball
Lewis Edwards (1809–1887), Welsh educator
Lewis A. Edwards (1811–1879), New York politician
Louis Edwards (1914–1980), Chairman of Manchester United
Louis F. Edwards (died 1939), American politician

M
 Mack Ray Edwards (1918–1971), American child sex abuser/serial killer; committed suicide by hanging in his prison cell
Mark Edwards (disambiguation), multiple people
Marshall Edwards (born 1952), American baseball player
Marshall Edwards (American football) (1915–2000), American football player
Martin Edwards (born 1945), English football chairman
Martin Edwards (author) (born 1955), English writer
Mary Edwards (disambiguation), multiple people
Mel Edwards (born 1937), American sculptor
Michael Edwards (disambiguation), also Mike Edwards, multiple people
Monroe Edwards (1808–1847), American forger and slave trader
Myrtle Edwards (1921–2010), Australian cricketer and softball player

N
Natalie Edwards (born 1978), former senior official with the United States Treasury
Ness Edwards (1897–1968) was a Welsh miner, trade unionist and politician
Nelson "Jack" Edwards (died 1974), first African-American to hold a seat on the UAW's International Executive Board
Ninian Edwards (1775–1833), American politician
Ninian Wirt Edwards (1809–1899), American politician

P
 Patrick Edwards (born 1988), American football player
 Paul Edwards (disambiguation), multiple people
 Perrie Edwards, (born 1993), English singer and member of British girl group Little Mix
 Phil Edwards (disambiguation), Phil and Philip, multiple people
 Pierpont Edwards (1750–1826), American lawyer

R
R. T. Edwards, pseudonym of Ron Goulart, writer
Ray Edwards (disambiguation), multiple people
Ray K. Edwards (1923–1942), United States Marine who received the Silver Star
Richey Edwards (1967–1995 (presumed)), Welsh musician (Manic Street Preachers)
Rhys Edwards (1991–2016), Art Director

Roger Edwards (disambiguation), multiple people
Ronnie Claire Edwards (1933–2016), American actress
Ronnie Edwards (politician) (1952–2016), American politician
Roy Edwards (1937–1999), Canadian ice hockey player
Roy Edwards (politician) (1954–2020), American politician

S
Sally Edwards (born 1947), American triathlete
Sam Edwards (disambiguation), Sam and Samuel, multiple people
Sara Edwards (born 1962), Welsh television presenter
Sara Edwards (American television presenter)
Sarah Edwards (disambiguation), multiple people
Sebastián Edwards, (born 1953) Chilean economist, writer, speaker, UCLA professor, consultant
Sean Edwards (disambiguation), multiple people
Shane Edwards (born 1988), Australian rules football player
Shane Edwards (basketball) (born 1987), American basketball player
Shania Twain (née Eilleen Regina Edwards, born 1965), Canadian singer
Shaun Edwards (born 1966), Rugby League player and Rugby Union coach
Stacy Edwards (born 1965), American actress
Stan Edwards (born 1960), American football player
Stan Edwards (footballer born 1942), English footballer
Stan Edwards (footballer born 1926) (1926–1989), English footballer
Steve Edwards (born 1980), English singer
Sunny Edwards (born 1996), British boxer

T
 T. J. Edwards (born 1996), American football player
 Thyra J. Edwards (1857–1953), African-American educator, journalist, labor activist, and social worker
 Tommy Edwards (1922–1969), American singer-songwriter
 Tony Edwards (born 1944), Australian comic book artist and illustrator
 Torri Edwards (born 1977), American sprinter
 Trevor Edwards (born 1937), Welsh footballer
 Tudor Edwards (1890–1946), Welsh thoracic surgeon

V 
 Victoria Edwards (born 1948), New Zealand artist, printmaker and art educator
 Vivian Edwards (1896–1949), American actress in silent films

W
Walter Edwards (disambiguation), multiple people
Wilfred Edwards (disambiguation), multiple people
Willarda V. Edwards, African American physician
William Edwards (disambiguation), multiple people
Wynn Edwards (1842–1900), American politician

X
Xavier Edwards (born 1999), American professional baseball player

Y
Yvvette Edwards, British novelist of Caribbean heritage

Z
Zena Edwards (born 1960s), British poet of Caribbean heritage

Others
Matilda Betham-Edwards (1836–1919), English novelist and writer
Alphonse Milne-Edwards (1835–1900), French zoologist
Henri Milne-Edwards (1800–1885), French naturalist
V. C. Wynne-Edwards (1906–1997), British zoologist
Yvonne Edwards Tucker (born 1941), maiden name Edwards, American potter

See also
Diane Modahl (born 1966 as Diane Edwards), English middle-distance runner
Edwards family, of Chile
Edward
Edwardes

References

Welsh-language surnames
English-language surnames
Surnames of English origin
Surnames of Welsh origin
Anglicised Welsh-language surnames
Patronymic surnames
Surnames from given names